Lebanon Presbyterian Church is a historic church on Lebanon Presbyterian Church Road in Utica, Mississippi.

It was built in 1836 and added to the National Register in 1999.

Lebanon Presbyterian Church is a member of the Presbyterian Church in America.

References

Churches on the National Register of Historic Places in Mississippi
Georgian architecture in Mississippi
Churches completed in 1836
19th-century Presbyterian church buildings in the United States
Churches in Hinds County, Mississippi
Presbyterian Church in America churches in Mississippi
National Register of Historic Places in Hinds County, Mississippi